The 2014 Liga Nusantara East Java season is the first edition of Liga Nusantara East Java is a qualifying round of the 2014 Liga Nusantara.

The competition scheduled starts on 25 May 2014.

Teams
This season there are 37 East Java club participants, divided into 3 group of 9 and 1 group of 10.

League table
Divided into 3 group of 9 and 1 group of 10, winner of each group qualify for the 2014 Liga Nusantara.

References 

East Java
Sport in East Java